Thidarat Wiwasukhu (born 18 February 1985) is a Thai footballer who plays as a defender. She has been a member of the Thailand women's national team.

International career
Thidarat represented Thailand at the 2004 FIFA U-19 Women's World Championship. She capped at senior level during the 2007 Southeast Asian Games, two AFC Women's Asian Cup editions (2008 and 2010), the 2010 Asian Games and the 2012 AFC Women's Olympic Qualifying Tournament.

References

1985 births
Living people
Thidarat Wiwasukhu
Women's association football defenders
Thidarat Wiwasukhu
Competitors at the 2007 Southeast Asian Games
Thidarat Wiwasukhu
Southeast Asian Games medalists in football
Footballers at the 2010 Asian Games